Jesper Lauridsen (born 27 March 1991) is a Danish professional footballer who plays for Esbjerg fB as a left-back or centre-back.

Career
Lauridsen joined Esbjerg fB in February 2016. On 16 January 2020, he moved to Randers FC. On 31 August 2022, he returnede to Esbjerg.

References

External links
 
 DBU profile

1991 births
Living people
Association football defenders
Danish men's footballers
FC Midtjylland players
Hobro IK players
Esbjerg fB players
Randers FC players
Danish Superliga players
Danish 1st Division players
Denmark youth international footballers
Denmark under-21 international footballers
Sportspeople from the Central Denmark Region